is a Japanese former figure skater. He is the 1989 World Junior bronze medalist and a three-time Japanese national champion. He placed 13th at the 1992 Winter Olympics and 12th at the 1994 Winter Olympics. After retiring from competition, he became a coach. He is the father of Japanese figure skater Yuma Kagiyama.

Competitive highlights

References 

1971 births
Living people
Figure skaters from Nagoya
Japanese male single skaters
Olympic figure skaters of Japan
Figure skaters at the 1992 Winter Olympics
Figure skaters at the 1994 Winter Olympics
World Junior Figure Skating Championships medalists
Universiade medalists in figure skating
Universiade bronze medalists for Japan
Competitors at the 1993 Winter Universiade
Aichi Institute of Technology alumni
20th-century Japanese people